"Seven Day Fool" is an R&B song written by American songwriter Billy Davis, and first recorded by American singer Etta James for Argo Records (a subsidiary of Chess Records) in 1961. The track was released both on a 45 RPM single (Argo #5402), paired with "It's Too Soon to Know", and on her album The Second Time Around (Argo #4011). Although not a big hit upon release, only reaching 95 in the United States, it has since become very well known on the Northern Soul and Mod scenes in the United Kingdom.

Charts

Jully Black version

A second recording of "Seven Day Fool" was made in 2007 by Canadian singer-songwriter Jully Black, produced by Black Eyed Peas' drummer & songwriter Keith Harris. It was released in August 2007 as the lead single from Black's second album, Revival. It peaked at number 9 on the Canadian Hot 100, becoming her first top 10 single.

Music video
In September 2007, the music video for "Seven Day Fool" was released.

Charts

References

External links
 https://www.youtube.com/watch?v=qKZmd6RZhZE Recording by Gizzelle on Wild Records (2011)

1961 singles
2007 singles
Etta James songs
Jully Black songs
Songs written by Billy Davis (songwriter)
Chess Records singles
1961 songs
Song recordings produced by Keith Harris (record producer)